The 2018 ITM Auckland SuperSprint was a motor racing event for Supercars, held on the weekend of 2 to 4 November 2018. The event was held at Pukekohe Park Raceway near Pukekohe, New Zealand, and consisted of two races, 200 kilometres in length. It was the 15th event of sixteen in the 2017 Supercars Championship and hosted races 28 and 29 of the season. It was the thirteenth running of the Auckland SuperSprint.

Report

Practice

Race 28

Qualifying

References

Auckland SuperSprint
2018 in New Zealand motorsport
Auckland SuperSprint